The Copa Truck is a Brazilian auto racing series, composed of trucks prepared for race. The category replaces the Fórmula Truck series in 2017.

History 
The origin of the category came after nine teams left Formula Truck because of disagreements with the troubled management of Neusa Navarro Félix; these teams joined in an association creating the category that came to replace Fórmula Truck. The new category brings together all the teams and drivers of the old category. In November 2017, it was homologated by the Brazilian Confederation of Automobilismo (CBA) and was recognized as an official championship.

Circuits

  Autódromo Eduardo Prudêncio Cabrera (2018–2019)
  Autódromo Internacional Ayrton Senna (Caruaru) (2017)
  Autódromo Internacional Ayrton Senna (Goiânia) (2017–present)
  Autódromo Internacional Ayrton Senna (Londrina) (2019, 2022–present)
  Autódromo Internacional de Cascavel (2018–2021, 2023)
  Autódromo Internacional de Curitiba (2018, 2020–2021)
  Autódromo Internacional de Guaporé (2018)
  Autódromo Internacional de Santa Cruz do Sul (2019, 2022)
  Autódromo Internacional de Tarumã (2017, 2021–present)
  Autódromo Internacional Orlando Moura (2017–2019)
  Autódromo Internacional Virgílio Távora (2017)
  Autódromo Oscar y Juan Gálvez (2018)
  Autódromo Potenza Eireli (2021)
  Circuito dos Cristais (2018–2019)
  Interlagos Circuit (2017–present)
  Velopark (2019)

List Champions

List Champions of Super Truck

List of Regional Cup champions

See also 
 Fórmula Truck

References 

Copa Truck
Auto racing series in Brazil
2017 establishments in Brazil
Motorsport competitions in Brazil